The Zorrilla Theatre or Teatro Zorrilla, also known as the Duláang Zorrilla sa Maynila ("Zorrilla Theater in Manila") in Tagalog, was a prominent theater in the Philippines. Once located along Calle Iris (now a part of C.M. Recto Avenue), Manila, the theater was named after José Zorrilla (1817–1893), a Spanish poet and playwright. The building, which had a seating capacity of 900 people, was officially opened on August 17, 1893, and it was the venue for Spanish-language and Tagalog-language stage performances.

Former Site
The former Zorilla Theatre is now currently occupied by a new commercialized buildings mostly now occupied by a various hotels and also a food restaurant establishments as well in the mid 60's up to the present in C.M. Recto Avenue in Manila.

See also
Manila Grand Opera House

References

External links
1911 photograph of the Zorrilla Theater at Retrato.com.ph
Photograph of the interior of the Zorrilla Theater at Retrato.com.ph
Photograph of the exterior of the Zorrilla Theater at Himig.com.ph

Former buildings and structures in Manila
Theaters in Manila
Buildings and structures in Sampaloc, Manila
Theatres completed in 1893
19th-century architecture in the Philippines